Savvas may refer to:

Savvas (given name)
Savvas (surname)
Ayios Savvas, Nicosia, a neighbourhood and parish of Nicosia, Cyprus

See also
Sabbas
Savva (disambiguation)